Counsman is an unincorporated community in Sutter County, California, United States.

References

Unincorporated communities in California
Unincorporated communities in Sutter County, California